Musaab Abdulmajeed (Arabic:مصعب عبد المجيد) (born 9 February 1993) is a Qatari footballer. He currently plays for Al-Khor .

External links

References

Qatari footballers
1993 births
Living people
Al-Khor SC players
Qatari people of Sudanese descent
Sudanese emigrants to Qatar
Naturalised citizens of Qatar
Qatar Stars League players
Association football midfielders